Acrolophus kearfotti is a moth of the family Acrolophidae. It was described by Harrison Gray Dyar Jr. in 1903. It is found in North America, including Arizona, California, Florida, Nevada and New Mexico.

The wingspan is 24–27 mm.

References

Moths described in 1903
kearfotti